Renée Hayek (Arabic: رينيه الحايك) is a Lebanese writer and novelist. She was born in Sarba and studied philosophy at the Lebanese University in Beirut. She has published a number of books, including short story collections and novels.

One of her short stories The Phone Call has been translated and anthologised in a collection of stories by Lebanese women writers. Two of her recent novels, Prayer for the Family and A Short Life, were longlisted for the Arabic Booker Prize, in 2009 and 2011 respectively.

Selected works
 Portraits of Forgetfulness (short stories)
 The Well and the Sky
 The Land of the Snows
 Days of Paris
 Prayer for the Family
 A Short Life

References

Lebanese novelists
Lebanese women short story writers
Lebanese short story writers
Lebanese women writers
Lebanese University alumni
Living people
Year of birth missing (living people)